
Gmina Milówka is a rural gmina (administrative district) in Żywiec County, Silesian Voivodeship, in southern Poland.

Villages
Gmina Milówka contains the villages and settlements of Kamesznica, Laliki, Milówka, Nieledwia and Szare.

Neighbouring gminas
Gmina Milówka is bordered by the town of Wisła and by the gminas of Istebna, Radziechowy-Wieprz, Rajcza, Ujsoły and Węgierska Górka.

Twin towns – sister cities

Gmina Milówka is twinned with:

 Kóny, Hungary
 Markaz, Hungary
 Milíkov, Czech Republic
 Topoľníky, Slovakia
 Valentigney, France

References

Milowka
Żywiec County